Didia fuscostriatella is a species of snout moth in the genus Didia. It was described by Hiroshi Yamanaka in 2006 and is known from Japan.

The larvae feed on Bauhinia japonica.

References

External links

Moths described in 2006
Endemic fauna of Japan
Phycitini
Moths of Japan